is a Japanese professional sumo wrestler from Neyagawa, Osaka. After winning a gold medal in sumo at the 2013 World Combat Games, he made his professional debut in 2015, wrestling with the Kise stable and he won the jonokuchi division championship in his first tournament. He reached the top makuuchi division in March 2017, but a pair of serious injuries led to two extended layoffs, and his rank dropped to the lowest since his debut tournament, and it was three and a half years before he returned to top-level competition. He has two kinboshi, or gold stars, for defeating a yokozuna. His unpredictable style has made him a favourite with tournament crowds.

Amateur career
While attending the School of Education, Kwansei Gakuin University, Ura was a member of the sumo club.  He competed in sumo at the 2013 World Combat Games at Saint Petersburg, Russia, winning a gold medal in the lightweight division.

Professional career

Debut and early success
In February 2015, he announced his intention to enter the Kise stable as a professional sumo wrestler, and after his first bouts in March, made his tournament debut in the May basho, winning the  division.  He again performed well in the July tournament, posting a 7–0 record and losing a playoff for the  division championship. After going 5–2 in the  division in September, he finished the year with a 7–0 record as a  debutante, again losing a division championship playoff in November.

Ura began 2016 with a 6–1 record and another  playoff loss in January. In recognition of becoming the first among their alumni to achieve  (the two highest divisions in sumo) rank, he was given a keshō-mawashi by Kwansei Gakuin University. He finished the May tournament 10–5 and with a 11–4 finish in the July tournament, he entered the September event as the top-ranked , but he went 6–9, his first losing record, having fractured a bone in his left wrist that required post-tournament surgery. On his return, he posted a 8–7 record in the November tournament.

His overall 11–4 record in the January 2017 tournament led to his promotion to the top  division and a rank of  12. In March 2017, before a home crowd in Osaka, he achieved a winning record (kachi-koshi) of 8–7, and entered the May 2017 tournament at  10. There he scored eleven wins against four losses in this tournament, but did not receive a special prize for his efforts, despite speculation that he would win the Technique Award. Former  Kitanofuji, commentating for NHK, expressed his surprise at the omission. Still, his performance earned him a career-high ranking of  4 for the July 2017 tournament. There he got off to a 5–1 start, but then injuries among those ranked above him shifted him to a more challenging schedule, facing the san'yaku, the foremost wrestlers, for the first time.  Though he defeated Harumafuji on Day 9 to earn his first kinboshi or gold star for a win over a yokozuna, he injured his knee in a defeat to ozeki Takayasu on the following day, and he lost four of his remaining five matches to finish with a make-koshi 7–8 record.

Injury problems and returns
Ura withdrew from the summer regional tour that followed the July 2017 tournament, citing damaged right knee ligaments, and indicated he would need a month's rest to recover. He returned for the September tournament, but exacerbated his injury on the second day and was forced to withdraw, with reports indicating a right knee anterior cruciate ligament injury and a left knee meniscus injury that would require surgery. In this tournament he went 6–1 to stop his slide, and followed that with an undefeated 7–0 record and  division championship in the November 2018 tournament.

He achieved a 6–1 record in this first tournament back, and in the following tournament in January 2020, from the rank of  28, an undefeated 7–0 record and a playoff victory earned Ura the division championship. Fighting at the rank of  30 at the March tournament, Ura won his second straight division championship with another perfect 7–0 record and a playoff win. In the March 2021 tournament he reached 6–2 on Day 8 after a win over another fan favorite, Enhō, a highly-anticipated first match between the two in professional sumo, but a minor injury Ura suffered in the contest forced his withdrawal from the next two days of the tournament, before returning to gain 4 additional wins.

Ura won the  championship in May 2021 with a 12–3 record, ensuring his return to  after 21 tournaments away. He now holds the record for the lowest rank reached before a successful  return ( 106 West).

Return to top division
Ura began the July 2021 tournament ranked at  13, and after a 10–5 record rose to  6 for September.  In a tournament that included a pairing that matched him against fellow top division returnee and newly-promoted  Terunofuji, he finished 7-8. He then opened the November tournament one rank lower at  7. In this tournament he produced a 10–5 record and won his first special prize, for Technique, and as a consequence surpassing his pre-injury highest rank, opening the January 2022 tournament at  2 and again achieving a winning record of 8–7. At  1 in March, he finished 4–11, dropping him to  6. In the May 2022 tournament, Ura's record after the 13th day stood at 9–4, just one win behind three leaders tied on 10–3, but he withdrew from the tournament on Day 14 with a left ankle injury.

In the September 2022 tournament, Ura stood up by winning his fourth day with a rare  Tsutaezori kimarite and earned his second kinboshi when he defeated yokozuna Terunofuji on the sixth day.

Style
He is predominantly a pusher, but the unpredictability of his improvisational style that responds to opponents' moves has made him popular.  Ura has been called "agile as a gymnast" and his bouts acrobatic. His favourite techniques as listed in his Japan Sumo Association profile include  pushing/thrusting techniques as well as the rare  (leg grab), and he has also drawn notice for performing other rare winning techniques.  In the May 2016 tournament, he won a  bout by koshinage, a hip throw. He employed another rare winning technique at the January 2017 tournament, tasukizori (reverse backward body drop), against fellow  wrestler, Amakaze, its first instance in sumo's upper divisions since 1955 when winning techniques were first announced. In the November 2020 tournament he deployed two unusual techniques. On the fifth day he used  to defeat Kyokushūhō, the first time the move had been seen at sekitori level since Tomonohana used it against Hananokuni in September 1993. Tomonohana (now Tamagaki Oyakata) was at the ringside in his role as a judge to see Ura's win. On the fourteenth day of the same tournament Ura defeated Azumaryū with the rare , or "backward lean out," which brought cheers from the crowd when the technique was announced.

Career record

See also
Glossary of sumo terms
List of active sumo wrestlers
List of active gold star earners
List of sumo tournament second division champions

References

External links

Wrestlers to Watch: Ura at :NHK World
NHK Sumopedia: Mawashi (prominently featuring Ura)
NHK Sumopedia: Tasuki-zori/Reverse backwards body drop (opens with Ura performing rare technique)

1992 births
Living people
Japanese sumo wrestlers
Kwansei Gakuin University alumni
Sumo people from Osaka Prefecture
People from Neyagawa, Osaka
Sumo wrestlers who use their birth name